Dawid Abramowicz (born 16 May 1991) is a Polish professional footballer who plays as a left-back for Radomiak Radom.

Club career
On 14 August 2020, he signed a two-year contract with Wisła Kraków.

Honours

Club
Radomiak Radom
I liga: 2020–21

Personal life
He has a brother, Mateusz, who is also a footballer - currently playing for TSV Eintracht Stadtallendorf.

References

External links

1991 births
People from Brzeg Dolny
Sportspeople from Lower Silesian Voivodeship
Living people
Polish footballers
Association football defenders
Śląsk Wrocław players
Olimpia Grudziądz players
Chojniczanka Chojnice players
Wisła Płock players
Skra Częstochowa players
Odra Opole players
Bruk-Bet Termalica Nieciecza players
Puszcza Niepołomice players
GKS Katowice players
GKS Tychy players
Radomiak Radom players
Wisła Kraków players
Ekstraklasa players
I liga players
II liga players